History of the Jews in Carthage refers to the history and presence of people of Jewish ancestry in ancient Carthage.

Carthage (from the Phoenician Kart-Hadasht, the "New City", written without vowels in Punic as Qrthdst) was a city in North Africa located on the eastern side of Lake Tunis, across from the center of modern Tunis in Tunisia.

Though Josephus Flavius associated the city's foundation with Jews and some scholars have conjectured that small groups of Jews may have been present in Carthage as early as the Punic era,  the earliest evidence of Jewish presence in the area dates to the second century C.E.

Carthage was founded from Tyre. According to the Bible, the city of Tyre and Sidon, were part of the tribe of Asher.

″even unto great Zidon; And then the coast turneth to Ramah, and to the strong city Tyre″

Identification with Tarshish
The Hebrew Bible never mentions Carthage, though the Septuagint translated the toponym  Tarshish at Isaiah 23:1 as Karkhēdōn (Kαρχηδών), the Greek term Josephus used in his Against Apion to denote Carthage. The term Tarshish also figures in the Book of Jonah, where Jonah, to evade God's mission that he preach in Nineveh, boards ship in Jaffa, and sails towards a city of that name. This led some to suggest that there too Carthage was his objective. Much modern research tends to the view, however, that the Tarshish here  denotes the Iberian Tartessos.

Jewish settlement
A tradition conserved among the Jews of Djerba nearby states that the community was built of exiles after the destruction of the First Temple who had joined earlier Jews living there, that their El Ghriba synagogue has an equally ancient date, and that some of this community assisted the Phoenicians in establishing Carthage.

One theory has espoused the idea that, with the destruction of Tyre and Sidon, and their daughter-city Carthage, there was created an orphaned Phoenician diaspora not unlike that of the Jews and that the puzzling disappearance of Phoenicians may have been due to the attraction they might have felt for a similarly dispersed people, leading to conversion to Judaism. A late source from the 10th century, Josippon, states that Titus had settled some 50,000 Jews  in North Africa, and Ibn Khaldun (1332–1406), who himself came from Tunisia stated that a number of Berber tribes he had encountered had converted to Judaism. The Talmudim conserve the names of four rabbis of Carthage, with the Talmud Yerushalmi, mentioning Abba/Ba 4 times, and Hinena (in the Bavli, Hanan) twice, though there is some dispute over the interpretation of these references, with one hypothesis suggesting the references must refer to the flourishing Jewish community in Cartagena in Spain.

The French archaeologist A. L. Delattre  uncovered a large Jewish necropolis, dating to  the early 3rd century CE,  at Gammarth consisting of  105 chambers, each with roughly 15 loculi, which would have allowed burial for 1,500 people. The Jewishness of the site is proven by symbols of the menorah, shofar, lulav and  etrog. The epigraphic evidence is predominantly in Latin, with one name, Tibereius, indicating a possible Israeli origin. The pagan funerary sign Dis manibus, elsewhere disliked by Jews, occurs in one inscription. The overall impression gained from this evidence is that Jews in and around Carthage shared with gentiles a common language, funerary formulae and ornamentation, differing only in theior recourse to synagogues, occasional use of Hebraic symbols and their separation at death by interment in a separate cemetery.

Tertullian though at times venting his ire at Jews, stating that synagogues were 'fountains of persecution' and that Jews harassed Christians,- a suggestion for which there is no evidence from North Africa at that time-  nonetheless in his remarks on the community at Carthage, also shows that they earned his grudging respect.

Some accounts state that after Gaiseric sacked Rome, he took the holy vessels which Titus had looted from the Temple in Jerusalem with him to the new Vandal capital in Carthage, where the Byzantine general  Belisarius retrieved them when he won the city back in 533 C.E., and had them transported to Constantinople. When a wise Jew pointed out the danger of harbouring these vessels, which had brought downfall to Rome and Carthage. Justinian, it is said, was so unnerved he had them sent to Jerusalem where they were stored in a Christian church.

Quotation attributed to the Carthaginian rabbi Abba b.Isaac 
″From Tyre to Carthage, the nations know Israel and their Father Who is in heaven; but from Tyre westwards and from Carthage eastwards the nations know neither Israel nor their Father Who is in heaven″

See also
 Maghrebi Jews
 History of the Jews in Tunisia
 History of the Jews in Morocco
 History of the Jews in Algeria
 History of the Jews in Libya

References

Jews
Carthage
Carthage
Jews
Carthage
Carthage